Julie Robyn Speight (born 1 October 1966) is an Australian former cyclist, eight time National champion, and Australia's first female Olympic and Commonwealth Games track cyclist, competing in the women's sprint event at the 1988 Seoul Summer Olympics and winning a silver medal in the 1990 Auckland Commonwealth Games. At the time, she was described as 'a class above any other female rider in the country.'

Biography
Speight is the only Australian to have held both the national Road Race title and the national Track Sprint title in the same year (1983).

Also in 1983, Speight- along with Michelle Robbins, Elizabeth Battle, and Paula Verral- initiated 'the first organized Australian women's tour of Europe, culminating in the 1983 World road title in Switzerland.' The women self-funded their tour, with the assistance of their respective cycling clubs, as the Australian Cycling Federation refused to support any international women's racing.

In 1984 Speight qualified for the inaugural Women's Road Race at the 1984 Los Angeles Summer Olympics. Australian cycling officials, however, later reneged by electing not to send a women's team to Los Angeles. Instead, Speight was sent to the Yu King Cup Road Race in China, where she became the first Australian female cyclist to win an international race, beating several of her international opponents who went on to race in the Los Angeles Olympics later that year-  the very event in which the Australian Cycling Federation disallowed Speight's entry.

When Speight started competing in the early 1980s there were only two national track events in which women could enter - the Sprint, and the Scratch Race.  During her career, Speight lobbied for more women's events to be added as state and national titles, and was successful in her campaign to have a Points Race included in the 1990 Australian National Track Championships.

Speight was coached by Ken Smith (1981-1984) and John Crouchley (1986-).

In 2017 Speight was recognized for her trailblazing contribution to Australian women's cycling through her induction into the Cycling Australia Hall of Fame.

Speight lives in Hobart, Tasmania, where she is on the Executive of the Tasmanian Olympic Council and also works to raise awareness of concussion related injuries, namely Chronic traumatic encephalopathy (CTE) in athletes.

Honours 
In 1983, Speight was awarded the Bradley Matthews Memorial Award from Randwick City Council. In 1984 she received the Sydney Girls' High School Old Girls' Union's "Centenary Prize for Excellence", for meritorious completion of her Year 12 studies while simultaneously embarking on an international cycling career.

In 1988 she was nominated for Australian Female Athlete of the Year by the Confederation of Australian Sports. In 1989, Speight was crowned Rider of the Year at T-Town Velodrome, Trexlertown, Pennsylvania, United States, the track from which she would eventually announce her retirement from racing in 1997.

In 1994, Speight was inducted into the Randwick Sporting Hall of Fame. In 2017, Speight was the first female track sprinter to be inducted into the Cycling Australia Hall of Fame.

Major results

References

External links 
 Julie Speight at Cycling Australia
 

1966 births
Living people
Australian female cyclists
Olympic cyclists of Australia
Cyclists at the 1988 Summer Olympics
Place of birth missing (living people)
Cyclists at the 1990 Commonwealth Games
Commonwealth Games silver medallists for Australia
Commonwealth Games medallists in cycling
Medallists at the 1990 Commonwealth Games